is a passenger railway station located in the city of Fujimi, Saitama, Japan, operated by the private railway operator Tōbu Railway.

Lines
Located between Mizuhodai and Fujimino stations, it is 22.0 km from the Ikebukuro terminus. Only Semi express and Local services stop at this station.

Station layout
The station consists of an island platform serving two tracks. The station building is elevated and located above the platform.

Platforms

History
The station opened on 1 May 1914 coinciding with the opening of the Tojo Railway line from Ikebukuro. The west entrance was opened in 1979.

Through-running to and from  via the Tokyo Metro Fukutoshin Line commenced on 14 June 2008.

From 17 March 2012, station numbering was introduced on the Tōbu Tōjō Line, with Tsuruse Station becoming "TJ-17".

Passenger statistics
In fiscal 2019, the station was used by an average of 50,210 passengers daily.

Surrounding area
 Fujimi City Office
 
 LaLaport Fujimi shopping mall

See also
 List of railway stations in Japan

References

External links

 Tobu station information 

Railway stations in Saitama Prefecture
Stations of Tobu Railway
Tobu Tojo Main Line
Railway stations in Japan opened in 1914
Fujimi, Saitama